Clément-Émile Roques (8 December 1880—4 September 1964) was a French Cardinal of the Roman Catholic Church. He served as Archbishop of Rennes from 1940 until his death, and was elevated to the cardinalate in 1946 by Pope Pius XII.

Biography
Born in Graulhet, Clément-Émile Roques studied at the seminary in Albi and the Catholic Institute of Toulouse before being ordained to the priesthood on 2 April 1904. He then served as a professor, administrator, the prefect of studies, and superior of the seminary of Barral, in Castres, until 1929.

On 15 April 1929 Roques was appointed Bishop of Montauban by Pope Pius XI. He received his episcopal consecration on the following 24 June from Archbishop Pierre-Celestin Cézerac, with Archbishop Jules-Géraud Saliège and Bishop Charles Challiol serving as co-consecrators, in the Cathedral of Albi. Roques was later named Archbishop of Aix on 24 December 1934, and Archbishop of Rennes on 11 May 1940.

Pope Pius XII created him Cardinal Priest of S. Balbina in the consistory of 18 February 1946. He was papal legate to the 1947 National Eucharistic Congress in Nantes, and to the 1956 Congress in his see of Rennes. A cardinal elector in the 1958 papal conclave, Roques lived long enough to only attend the first two sessions of the Second Vatican Council from 1962 to 1963, and participate in the conclave of 1963 that selected Pope Paul VI. During his tenure as Archbishop, the Cardinal confirmed three miracles attributed to Our Lady of Lourdes.

Roques died in Rennes, at age 83. He is buried in the Metropolitan Cathedral of St. Peter.

References

External links
Cardinals of the Holy Roman Church
Catholic-Hierarchy 

1880 births
1964 deaths
Cardinals created by Pope Pius XII
20th-century French cardinals
Bishops of Montauban
Archbishops of Rennes
Participants in the Second Vatican Council
Bishops appointed by Pope Pius XI